Beinn Ruadh (664 m) is a mountain of Argyll and Bute in Scotland. Part of the Grampian Mountains, it lies between Loch Eck and Loch Long in Argyll Forest Park.

A large and sprawling peak, its lower slopes are covered in forestry plantations. The nearest town is Dunoon a few miles to the south.

References

Mountains and hills of Argyll and Bute
Marilyns of Scotland
Grahams
Mountains and hills of the Southern Highlands